Tahar Tamsamani (born 10 September 1980) is a retired Moroccan boxer. He competed at the 2000, 2004 and 2008 Olympics and won a bronze medal in 2000.

In 2000 he won a bronze medal in the featherweight (57 kg) division, after falling in the semifinals to Kazakhstan's Bekzat Sattarkhanov.

At the 2004 Summer Olympics he was defeated in the first bout of the lightweight (60 kg) division by Uganda's Sam Rukundo. He qualified for the Athens Games by winning the gold medal at the 1st AIBA African 2004 Olympic Qualifying Tournament in Casablanca, Morocco. In the final of the event he defeated Tunisia's Taoufik Chouba.

At the 2008 Olympic qualifier he lost to Hamza Kramou but won the third-place bout and therefore qualified for his third Olympics. In Beijing he lost to Domenico Valentino in the first bout.

References

1980 births
Sportspeople from Marrakesh
Olympic boxers of Morocco
Living people
Boxers at the 2000 Summer Olympics
Boxers at the 2004 Summer Olympics
Boxers at the 2008 Summer Olympics
Olympic bronze medalists for Morocco
Featherweight boxers
Lightweight boxers
Olympic medalists in boxing
Moroccan male boxers
Medalists at the 2000 Summer Olympics
21st-century Moroccan people
20th-century Moroccan people